What the Hell Happened to Me? is the second studio album by Adam Sandler, released by Warner Bros. on 13 February 1996. It contains the official recording of "The Chanukah Song" (recorded live at University of California, Santa Barbara), which has become a holiday staple and one of Sandler's best-known works. It reached No. 80 on the Billboard Hot 100 and #25 on the US Modern Rock charts. It spent 57 weeks on the Billboard 200 chart and peaked at No. 18. It has been certified double-platinum, and as of 2011, has sold over 2,124,000 copies in the US, making it the best-selling comedy album since Nielsen SoundScan began tracking sales in 1991. The "Excited Southerner" skits on the album are early versions of what would end up being Sandler's character 'Bobby Boucher' in 1998's The Waterboy.

Sandler went on a 21-day US tour to support the album, complete with a live backing band, including guitarist Waddy Wachtel. The live performance from June 29, 1996, in the style of a rock concert, was aired as an hour long special on HBO, complete with covers of Foghat's "I Just Want to Make Love to You" and Bruce Springsteen's "Out in the Street", as well as a previously unreleased Halloween song, with a special appearance from fellow Saturday Night Live alum Chris Farley, as well as songs from Sandler's tenure at SNL, and cuts from the album and Sandler's first album, They're All Gonna Laugh at You!. The concert has since been uploaded to YouTube, where it has received 156 million views since March 2017. The success of the tour and HBO special also led to Sandler's next album, the mostly-songs What's Your Name?, in 1997.

Track listing

Tracks in bold are songs.

Featured personnel
 Adam Sandler – All Tracks
 Allen Covert – Tracks 1, 2, 10, 17, 19
 Frank Coraci – Tracks 2, 11, 13, 14, 17, 19
 Judd Apatow – Tracks 7, 11, 17, 19

Charts

Weekly charts

Year-end charts

Songs chart positions

Certifications

References

Adam Sandler albums
1996 albums
Warner Records albums
1990s comedy albums